VSD 2 was a 54ft trimaran designed by Derek Kelsall and built in 1979 for French yachtsman Eugène Riguidel who sailed her in the 1981 TwoSTAR, in which he achieved eighth place.

Dimensions
Load Waterline Length: 
Load Waterline Length: 46 ft

See also
List of multihulls

References

Trimarans
1970s sailing yachts